The 2022 Bolivarian Games (Spanish:Juegos Bolivarianos), officially the XIX Bolivarian Games Valledupar 2022, was an international multi-sport event that was held in Valledupar, Colombia from June 24 to July 5. It was the fifth time of the event in Colombia.

Participating nations
All 7 nations of the Organización Deportiva Bolivariana (ODEBO) and 4 invited nations competed in these Games.

ODEBO nations
  
 
  (host)
 
 
 
 

Invited nations

Sports
The Games featured 389 events in 32 different sports, encompassing a total of 45 disciplines. 

 Aquatics
 
 
 
 
 
 
 
 Baseball
 
 
 Basketball
 
 
 
 
 
 
 
 
 
 
 
 
 
 
 
 
 
 
 
 
 
 
 
 
 
 
 
 
 
 
 
 
 
 
 Volleyball

Calendar
The sports program is as follows.

Medal table

Medalists

Archery
Recurve

Compound

Artistic swimming

Baseball

Bowling

Canoeing

Equestrian

Golf

Roller sports
Artistic roller skating

Inline speed skating

Rugby sevens

Table tennis

Taekwondo

Triathlon

Water polo

Wrestling

References

External links
 Official site

 
Bolivarian Games
Bolivarian Games
Bolivarian Games
Bolivarian Games
Bolivarian Games
Multi-sport events in Colombia
International sports competitions hosted by Colombia